Elections to the Liverpool School Board were held on Friday 17 November 1876. 

Each voter had fifteen votes to cast.

After the election, the composition of the school board was:

* - Retiring board member seeking re-election

Elected

References

1876 English local elections
1876
1870s in Liverpool